Glenn Palmer (born 17 March 1945) is a British sprint canoer who competed in the mid-1960s. He was eliminated in the semifinals of the K-4 1000 m event at the 1964 Summer Olympics in Tokyo.

References

External links
 

1945 births
Canoeists at the 1964 Summer Olympics
Living people
Olympic canoeists of Great Britain
British male canoeists